Intercontinental is an adjective to describe something which relates to more than one continent.

Intercontinental may also refer to:

 Intercontinental ballistic missile, a long-range guided ballistic missile
 InterContinental Hotels Group (IHG),  a British multinational hospitality company
 InterContinental Hotels & Resorts, a hotel brand and subsidiary of IHG
 InterContinental Manila, a former InterContinental Hotel in the Philippines
 Intercontinental Cup (disambiguation), various sports competitions
 WWE Intercontinental Championship, an American-owned professional wrestling championship 
 IWGP Intercontinental Championship, a Japanese-owned professional wrestling championship
 Intercontinental (horse) (born 2000), thoroughbred racehorse
 Intercontinental (album), a 1970 album by Joe Pass

See also    
Pluricontinentalism
Transcontinental (disambiguation)
International (disambiguation)
Multinational (disambiguation)
Continental (disambiguation)
Global (disambiguation)